Gregor Erhart (c. 1470? – 1540) was a German sculptor who was born at Ulm, the son of sculptor Michel Erhart. Gregor spent his working career at Augsburg, where he was made master in 1496, and where he died.

Attributions of sculpture to his workshop, mixing Late Gothic and Renaissance formulas, are based on a single documented work originally from the Cistercian Kaisheim Abbey, which was lost in World War II.

Further reading 
 Anja Schneckenburger-Broschek. "Erhart." In Grove Art Online. Oxford Art Online,  (accessed January 6, 2012; subscription required).
 Barbara Maier-Lörcher: Meisterwerke Ulmer Kunst. Ostfildern 2004. 
 Hans Koepf: Hans Multscher und die Ulmer Plastik. Schwäbische Kunstgeschichte. Vol. 3. Thorbecke, Konstanz 1963, pp. 15–20

External links 
 
 
 Entry for Gregor Erhart on the Union List of Artist Names

1470s births
1540 deaths
15th-century German sculptors
German male sculptors
16th-century German sculptors
Gothic sculptors